The Uttarakhand Gaurav Samman is one of the two highest civilian award of the State of Uttarakhand, along with Uttarakhand Ratna. It is awarded to a person for their extraordinary contribution in any field of human endeavour. It was constituted in the year 2021 by the Government of Uttarakhand. There have been a total of 5 recipients of this award.

History
The Uttarakhand Ratna award was constituted by the Chief Minister of Uttarakhand Pushkar Singh Dhami in 2021, on the occasion of 21st anniversary of Uttarakhand State Foundation Day which falls on 9 November each year.

Recipients

The recipients of Uttarakhand Gaurav Sammanare as follows:

References

Awards established in 2021
State awards and decorations of India
Uttarakhand